John James Swan (24 September 1848 – 22 February 1924) was an English first-class cricketer active 1870–76 who played for Surrey. He was born in Oadby; died in Maidstone.

References

1848 births
1924 deaths
English cricketers
Surrey cricketers
Surrey Club cricketers
North v South cricketers
Players of the South cricketers